Sri Narong Stadium is a multi-purpose stadium in Surin Province, Thailand. It is currently used mostly for football matches and is the home stadium of Surin City F.C.

This stadium used to be a boxing match between Khaosai Galaxy and Alberto Castro of Columbia in 1989, for Khaosai 11th defense of the WBA Junior bantamweight world title, the competition results are Khaosai won by TKO in 10th round.

References

Multi-purpose stadiums in Thailand
Buildings and structures in Surin province
Sport in Surin province